Elections were held in Alaska on Tuesday, November 2, 2010. The primary elections to select the parties' nominees were held on August 24, 2010.

Federal

United States Senate

United States House 

The one Alaska seat in the United States House of Representatives is up for election in 2010.

State

Governor and Lieutenant Governor

State Senate

Half of the seats of the Alaska Senate are up for election in 2010.

State House of Representatives

All of the seats in the Alaska House of Representatives are up for election in 2010.

Judicial positions
Multiple judicial positions will be up for election in 2010.
Alaska judicial elections, 2010 at Judgepedia

Ballot measures
Two ballot questions were certified for the August 24, 2010, ballot. Three ballot questions have so far been certified for the November 2, 2010, ballot.
Alaska 2010 ballot measures at Ballotpedia

Local
Many elections for county offices were also held on November 2, 2010.

References

External links
Alaska Division of Elections
Candidates for Alaska State Offices at Project Vote Smart
Alaska Candidate List at Imagine Election - Search for candidates by address or zip code
Alaska Election Guide from Congress.org
2010 House and Senate Campaign Finance for Alaska at the Federal Election Commission
Alaska Congressional Races in 2010 campaign finance data for federal-level candidates from OpenSecrets
Alaska 2010 campaign finance data for state-level candidates from Follow the Money
2010 Election at Anchorage Daily News
Alaska Polls at Pollster.com
Alaska at Rasmussen Reports